Sabine Pedersen (born 5 May 1986) is a Danish handball player who currently plays for Midtjylland Håndbold.

She has also played for Viborg HK and Aalborg DH.

References
 

1986 births
Living people
Sportspeople from Aalborg
Danish female handball players